Joseph Hayes (September 14, 1835 – August 19, 1912) was a Harvard graduate, civil engineer, and a brigadier general of the Union Army who commanded two brigades of the 5th Army Corps during the American Civil War.

Early life 
Joseph Hayes was born in South Berwick, Maine, September 14, 1835. He was the son of Judge William Allen Hayes, one of the leaders of the bar of the State of Maine. His ancestors upon both sides bore active and prominent part in both the Colonial and Revolutionary Wars.

He prepared for college at the Phillips-Exeter Academy. After graduating from Harvard in 1855 and taking a course in civil engineering he went West and engaged in the preliminary surveys of the Iowa line of the Chicago & Rock Island Railway.

Military career

Utah War 
In 1858 the Mormon outbreak occurred in Utah, and much excitement prevailed in the West. A company of artillery was organized and uniformed in Iowa and Hayes was elected its captain and was duly commissioned by Governor Kirkwood.

Civil War 
The war begun, Hayes offered his services to the State and was appointed captain of Company A, 20th Massachusetts Infantry Regiment, but on the following day, July 26, 1861, he received appointment of major of the 18th Massachusetts Infantry Regiment.

Praised at Fredericksburg 
Major Hayes went to the front with his regiment, and served through the Peninsula campaign. On the promotion of Lieutenant colonel lngraham, Hayes succeeded to the vacancy, his advancement dating from the 25th of August, 1862. As lieutenant colonel, Hayes commanded the regiment in the bloody Battle of Fredericksburg, being highly commended for his conduct. The regiment made three successive charges on St. Mary's Heights, and more than one-half of its officers and men were killed or disabled. A lieutenant recalled: "Colonel Hayes threw his arms about me and almost cried at this wicked murder".

Hayes became colonel of the regiment on the  promotion of Colonel Barnes to brigadier general, November 29, 1862. As colonel, he commanded his regiment in the Battle of Chancellorsville and also the rear guard in the retreat of the Army.

Engaged in several subsequent skirmishes, he commanded his regiment in the Battle of Gettysburg, the 22nd Massachusetts being united to his command the last day of the battle, when the famous attack was made by Pickett's division of the Rebel forces.

On the 1st of September, 1863, Hayes took command of the 1st Brigade, 1st Division, 5th Corps, which he held until the reorganization of the Army of the Potomac for the campaign of 1864.

Hayes then returned to the command of his regiment, and gallantly led it in the Battle of the Wilderness. He led the advance line of a column of attack which broke the enemy's line, and captured many prisoners. He received a severe wound in the head during the fighting of the first day, and was sent to the hospital at Washington.

Taken a prisoner 

Hayes was commissioned brigadier general of volunteers from the May 12, 1864, and on recovering from his wound was assigned to the command of a brigade in Ayers's Division of the 5th Corps. He held the command of the regular infantry brigade during the Siege of Petersburg, and the subsequent capture of the Weldon Railroad by his command, August 21, 1864. The Confederates made a desperate attempt to recapture this important communication to their base of supplies, attacking with thirteen brigades as reported, but were repulsed by General Hayes, who lost heavily, both his aid-de-camps, Lieutenants McKibbon (afterwards General Chambers McKibbon) and Perry being shot by his side.

The day following, accompanied by his adjutant general, Captain George W. Brady, while making a reconnaissance in front of the lines, and in a thick wood, General Hayes was captured by the Confederates and taken prisoner. He was for several months confined in Libby Prison, Richmond, Virginia. While a prisoner of war, in January, 1865, he was appointed by the Government United States commissioner of supplies in the seceded states, and performed the duty of distributing a large amount of clothing and food among the destitute Union prisoners in the South.

Upon his release and return to the field he was assigned to the command of two consolidated brigades, and from that day led the advance of the 5th Army Corps in its pursuit of Lee's Army, the white flag of surrender first coming to him when leading the most advanced line of battle at Appomattox Courthouse.

Hayes was not again in active command in the field, being mustered out on the 24th of August, 1865. His brevet of major general of volunteers dated from March 13, 1865.

Later life and death 
After the war, Hayes became widely known as a mining engineer. In 1877 he introduced the American system of hydraulic mining into the United States of Colombia.

General Hayes died, aged 77, in a private sanitarium at 154 West 74th St., New York City, August 20, 1912. He never married.

See also
List of American Civil War generals (Union)

References

Sources 

 Bowen, James L. (1889). Massachusetts in the War, 1861–1865. Springfield, MA: Clark W. Bryan & Co. pp. 935–36.
 Horn, John (2015). The Siege of Petersburg: The Battles for the Weldon Railroad, August 1864. California: Savas Beatie. pp. 124, 126, 129, 144–46, 157–59.
 Parker, John L. (1887). History of the Twenty-Second Massachusetts Infantry, the Second Company Sharpshooters, and the Third Light Battery, in the War of the Rebellion. Boston: The Regimental Association. Press of Rand Avery Company. pp. 357, 371, 374.
 Rable, George C. (2002). Fredericksburg! Fredericksburg! Chapel Hill and London: The University of North Carolina Press. p. 257.
 Rhea, Gordon C. (1994). The Battle of the Wilderness, May 5–6, 1864. Baton Rouge and London: Louisiana State University Press. pp. 101, 102, 125, 152, 154–57.
 Wilson, J. G.; Fiske, J., eds. (1892). "Hayes, Joseph". Appletons' Cyclopædia of American Biography. Vol. 3. New York: D. Appleton. p. 133.
 "Gen Hayes Dies in New York". The Boston Globe. Tuesday, August 20, 1912. p. 13.

External links 

 Downey, Brian, ed. (2012). "Federal (USV) Lieutenant Colonel Joseph Hayes". Antietam on the Web. Retrieved 26 May 2022.

1835 births
1912 deaths
Union Army generals
Harvard College alumni